Rosa María Lavín Ibarra (born 1973) is a Spanish economist and businesswoman. She is the current President of the Confederation of Cooperative Companies of the Basque Country, the Basque social economy business community, since 2015, being the first woman to hold the position and the first woman to lead a business organization in the Basque Country and in Spain.

She is also the current President of the Federation of Cooperative Companies of the Basque Country (ERKIDE) since 2019, also being the first woman to hold the position.

She is also the chief financial officer (CFO) of the SSI Group, among other corporate positions.

Early life and education 
She graduated from the University of the Basque Country with a bachelor's degree in economics and completed a postgraduate degree in social economy, cooperative companies and labor companies also at the University of the Basque Country.

Lavín also studied music and piano at the Municipal Conservatory of Sestao and later at the Municipal Conservatory of Bilbao, where she studied piano, which made it compatible with her university degree in economics. This came from the family, since her sister and her mother are also pianists (her mother plays the church organ and is a member of the parish choir).

Career 
Very attached to the Basque business field, from a young age she dedicated herself to the world of business, focusing on cooperative companies and public companies and private-equity firms, as well as the chief financial officer (CFO) in several companies, also with a presence on board of directors (among others, in those of Eroski in the Mondragón Corporation, of venture capital companies and seed capital companies) and also as a liquidator of companies.

In 1998 she started working at "SSI Group" and in 2010 she became the chief financial officer (CFO) and member of the board of directors of the same.

Her greatest notoriety came from the field of business organizations and employers' organization. She is a member of different business organizations and federations of social economy companies. In 2019 she was elected president of the Federation of Cooperative Companies of the Basque Country (ERKIDE), being the first woman to hold the position.

Chairperson of the Confederation of Cooperative Companies of the Basque Country 
In 2015 Rosa Lavín was elected president of the Confederation of Cooperative Companies of the Basque Country, the Basque social economy business community, becoming the first woman to hold this position since its creation in 1996.

In this way, he presides over one of the two Basque employers' organizations (the other is the Basque Business Confederation ConfeBasque), which includes banking entities, credit companies, labor, associated work and others, among them the largest is the Mondragon Corporation.

The Confederation of Cooperative Companies of the Basque Country represents all the companies of social economy in the Basque Country (it brings together almost two thousand companies), as it does the Spanish Confederation of Social Economy Companies of Social Economy Europe.

See also 

 Confederation of Basque Social Economy Businesses
 Mondragon Corporation

References 

1973 births
Living people
20th-century Spanish businesspeople
21st-century Spanish businesspeople